Templier is a surname. Notable people with the surname include:

 Olivier lo Templier (fl. 1269), Knight Templar and troubadour probably from Catalonia
 Raymond Templier (1891–1968), French jewellery designer
 Sylvain Templier (born 1971), French politician

See also 

 Knights Templar
 Templiers de Sénart

French-language surnames
Surnames of French origin